Eamonn Lynch was an Irish Labour Party politician, barrister and trade union official. He was the General Secretary of the Irish Trades Union Congress in 1928.

He was elected to Seanad Éireann in 1938 on the Labour Panel. He did not contest the 1943 Seanad election.

References

Year of birth missing
Year of death missing
Labour Party (Ireland) senators
Members of the 3rd Seanad
Irish trade unionists